Cycas zambalensis is a species of cycad endemic to Luzon, Philippines.

Distribution
There are two subpopulations of Cycas zambalensis, which are found in:
Barangay San Juan in Botolan, Zambales
near Barangay Pundaquit in San Antonio, Zambales, and in Barangay Cawag in Subic, Zambales

References

zambalensis
Endemic flora of the Philippines
Flora of Luzon